Villa Riachuelo is a barrio (district) of Buenos Aires, Argentina. It is the southernmost barrio in Capital Federal, and contains the Autódromo Juan y Oscar Gálvez, home of the Argentine Grand Prix until 1998.

External links

 Villa Riachuelo

Neighbourhoods of Buenos Aires